Heiki Hepner (born 17 February 1966 in Haapsalu) is an Estonian politician. He has been member of XIV Riigikogu.

In 1991 he graduated from Estonian University of Life Sciences in forestry engineering.

2008-2012 he was the president of Estonian Forest Society.

Since 2004 he is a member of party Isamaa.

References

Living people
1966 births
Isamaa politicians
Members of the Riigikogu, 2019–2023
21st-century Estonian politicians
Estonian University of Life Sciences alumni
People from Haapsalu